In mathematics, Appell series are a set of four hypergeometric series F1, F2, F3, F4 of two variables that were introduced by  and that generalize Gauss's hypergeometric series 2F1 of one variable. Appell established the set of partial differential equations of which these functions are solutions, and found various reduction formulas and expressions of these series in terms of hypergeometric series of one variable.

Definitions
The Appell series F1 is defined for |x| < 1, |y| < 1 by the double series

where  is the Pochhammer symbol. For other values of x and y the function F1 can be defined by analytic continuation. It can be shown that

Similarly, the function F2 is defined for |x| + |y| < 1 by the series

and it can be shown that

 
Also the function F3 for |x| < 1, |y| < 1 can be defined by the series

and the function F4 for |x|½ + |y|½ < 1 by the series

Recurrence relations
Like the Gauss hypergeometric series 2F1, the Appell double series entail recurrence relations among contiguous functions. For example, a basic set of such relations for Appell's F1 is given by:

Any other relation valid for F1 can be derived from these four.

Similarly, all recurrence relations for Appell's F3 follow from this set of five:

Derivatives and differential equations
For Appell's F1, the following derivatives result from the definition by a double series:

From its definition, Appell's F1 is further found to satisfy the following system of second-order differential equations:

A system partial differential equations for F2 is

The system have solution

Similarly, for F3 the following derivatives result from the definition:

And for F3 the following system of differential equations is obtained:

A system partial differential equations for F4 is

 
The system has solution

Integral representations
The four functions defined by Appell's double series can be represented in terms of double integrals involving elementary functions only . However,  discovered that Appell's F1 can also be written as a one-dimensional Euler-type integral:

This representation can be verified by means of Taylor expansion of the integrand, followed by termwise integration.

Special cases
Picard's integral representation implies that the incomplete elliptic integrals F and E as well as the complete elliptic integral Π are special cases of Appell's F1:

Related series

There are seven related series of two variables, Φ1, Φ2, Φ3, Ψ1, Ψ2, Ξ1, and Ξ2, which generalize Kummer's confluent hypergeometric function 1F1 of one variable and the confluent hypergeometric limit function 0F1 of one variable in a similar manner. The first of these was introduced by Pierre Humbert in 1920.
 defined four functions similar to the Appell series, but depending on many variables rather than just the two variables x and y. These series were also studied by Appell. They satisfy certain partial differential equations, and can also be given in terms of Euler-type integrals and contour integrals.

References

  (see also "Sur la série F3(α,α',β,β',γ; x,y)" in C. R. Acad. Sci. 90, pp. 977–980)
 
  (see p. 14)
 
 
  (see p. 224)
 
 
 
  (see also C. R. Acad. Sci. 90 (1880), pp. 1119–1121 and 1267–1269)
  (there is a 2008 paperback with )

External links
 
 

Hypergeometric functions
Mathematical series